Henry E. Burnham (1844–1917) was a U.S. Senator from New Hampshire from 1901 to 1913. Senator Burnham may also refer to:

Alfred A. Burnham (1819–1879), Connecticut State Senate
Clark Burnham (1802–1871), New York State Senate
Edward Goodwin Burnham (1827–1908), Connecticut State Senate